The Medal of Honor was introduced during the American Civil War and is the highest military decoration presented by the United States government to a member of its armed forces. The recipient must have distinguished themselves at the risk of their own life above and beyond the call of duty in action against an enemy of the United States. Due to the nature of this medal, it is commonly presented posthumously.
                                                        
Sixty-one (61) men of Hispanic heritage have been awarded the Medal of Honor. Of the sixty-one Medals of Honor presented to Hispanics, two were presented to members of the United States Navy, thirteen to members of the United States Marine Corps and forty-six to members of the United States Army. Forty-two Medals of Honor were presented posthumously.

The first recipient was Corporal Joseph H. De Castro of the Union Army for his actions at Gettysburg, Pennsylvania on July 3, 1863, during the American Civil War and the most recent recipient is Sergeant First Class Leroy Petry for his actions in Afghanistan. Corporal De Castro was a member of the Massachusetts Infantry, a militia that was not part of the "regular" army; however, Private David Bennes Barkley was a member of the regular army during World War I and has been recognized as the Army's first Hispanic Medal of Honor recipient. In 1864, Seaman John Ortega became the first Hispanic member of the U.S. Navy to receive the Medal of Honor and in 1900, Private France Silva became the first person of Hispanic descent in the U.S. Marine Corps to receive the medal. 
President Barack Obama awarded the Medal of Honor to 17 Hispanics on a March 18, 2014 in a ceremony in the White House. The award comes through the National Defense Authorization Act which called for a review of Jewish American and Hispanic American veterans from WWII, the Korean War and the Vietnam War to ensure that no prejudice was shown to those deserving the Medal of Honor.

Fifteen recipients were born outside the United States mainland, one each in Chile and Spain, five in Mexico and eight in Puerto Rico. Seaman Philip Bazaar from Chile received the medal in January 1865 and Seaman John Ortega from Spain in December 1865. The first native Mexican recipient was Staff Sergeant Marcario Garcia and the first Puerto Rican was PFC Fernando Luis Garcia. 1st Lt. Rudolph B. Davila, of Hispanic-Filipino descent, was the only person of Filipino ancestry to receive the medal for his actions in the war in Europe during World War II. Private Joe P. Martinez was the first Hispanic-American recipient to be awarded the Medal of Honor posthumously for combat heroism on American soil during the same conflict. 1st Lt. Baldomero Lopez, is the only Hispanic graduate of the United States Naval Academy to receive the Medal of Honor. Captain Humbert Roque Versace was the first recipient of the Medal of Honor to be given to an Army POW for his actions during captivity in Southeast Asia during the Vietnam War.

Terminology
Hispanic is an ethnic term employed to categorize any citizen or resident of the United States, of any racial background, of any country, and of any religion, who has at least one ancestor from the people of Spain or is of non-Hispanic origin, but has an ancestor from Mexico, Puerto Rico, Cuba, Central or South America, or other Hispanic origin. The three largest Hispanic groups in the United States are the Mexican-Americans, Puerto Ricans, and Cubans.

American Civil War
Three Hispanic Americans earned the Medal of Honor during the American Civil War, two were sailors of the Union Navy and one was a soldier of the 19th Massachusetts Infantry.

Boxer Rebellion
During the Boxer Rebellion only one Hispanic American received the Medal of Honor and that was France Silva who earned it for "distinguishing himself for meritorious conduct".

World War I

World War II

Korean War

Vietnam War

War in Afghanistan

By military branch

Note: The information in "Awards by branch of service Table" is based on the sourced information on the "List of Recipients Table".

See also

List of Medal of Honor recipients
Puerto Rican recipients of the Medal of Honor
Hispanic Americans in World War II
Hispanics in the United States Marine Corps
Hispanics in the United States Navy
Hispanics in the United States Coast Guard 
 Hispanics in the American Civil War

References

External links
Hispanic Medal of Honor Society Listing of Hispanics who received the Medal of Honor and those who are listed as nominees. 

 Eugene A. Obregon Congressional Medal of Honor Memorial Foundation, dedicated to financing and constructing a monument to honor the Medal of Honor recipients of Latino descent.

. (Original air date: September 20, 2005)

Lists of Medal of Honor recipients
Medal of Honor recipients
Medal of Honor